The following is a list of county-maintained roads in Cass County, Minnesota, United States. Some of the routes included in this list are also county-state-aid-highways (CSAH.)


Route list

References

 
Cass